The Rosfjord or Rosfjorden is a fjord in Lyngdal municipality in Agder county, Norway. The Austad peninsula lies on the east side of the fjord, with the village of Austad near the shoreline. The area surrounding the fjord was once part of the municipality of Austad from 1909 until its dissolution in 1963.

The northern end of the fjord is the location of the Agnefest harbour, a deep water harbour which dates back to at least 1771. Because of the high salinity of the water, the fjord rarely freezes, making it a suitable harbour.  Rosfjord Beach, a popular sandy beach in the summer, is also located at the northern end of the fjord. There is both a campsite and a hotel near the beach. Commercial camping on the site goes back to 1934. In the 1970s several cottages were built, and the hotel—Rosfjord Strandhotell—dates from 1986.

Gallery

See also
 List of Norwegian fjords

References

Beaches of Norway
Landforms of Agder
Ports and harbours of Norway
Lyngdal